Por amarte así (English: Loving You) is an Argentine telenovela  produced by Endemol and Azteka Films (aka Ganas de Hacer Ficcion) for Telefe. It premiered on November 14, 2016 and ended on February 3, 2017.

The series stars Gabriel Corrado as Francisco, Aylin Prandi as Luz, Catherine Fulop as Fátima, Maite Zumelzú as Malvina, Brenda Asnicar and Gaston Soffritti.

Plot summary 
Francisco Olivetti (Gabriel Corrado) is a prestigious rich attorney who has it all. He dedicated his life to one mission: make people obey the law. Life presents him a big challenge: to prove the innocence of a woman Luz Quiroja (Aylin Prandi) that disconnected her dying husband from the machine that kept him alive, obeying his last wish to end his pain.

Mercedes Olivetti (Brenda Asnicar), Francisco and Fatima’s daughter, is the only reason why they continue being married. She is spoiled but good girl. She has strong values that will be broken on a wild night with alcohol and drugs when her car crashes and wounds Manuel, a young promising football star that was about to be hired by a famous European football team.

Manuel Correa (Gastón Soffritti) ends up in a wheelchair with his life destroyed and Mercedes carries the guilt. Her mother and boyfriend will manipulate her to keep silent about the accident in order to avoid jail and destroy the whole family.

Mercedes and Manuel will start seeing each other and fall in love. Mercedes will hide from him the fact that she is the reason for his condition. Not only will their love be threatened, but also the love of Francisco and Luz will be when Fatima discovers them.

On the other side Manuel and Mercedes will prove that love and hate are parts of the same scale without knowing how it will end. Luz’s case is a great challenge; in fact, Francisco will be challenging his own heart by having the chance to love again. With the world against him, he will not give up until love fills his life again.

Cast

Main cast 
Gabriel Corrado - Francisco Olivetti 
Aylin Prandi - Luz Quiroga
Catherine Fulop - Fátima Pellegrini
Brenda Asnicar - Mercedes Olivetti
Gastón Soffritti - Manuel Correa

Recurring cast 
Facundo Gambandé - Santiago Ponce 
Olivia Viggiano - Noel García
Sergio Surraco - Joaquín Quintana
Héctor Bidonde - Valerio Pellegrini
Sergio Goycoechea - Richard Olivetti
Esmeralda Mitre - Camila
Nacho Gadano - Javier Ponce
Santiago Caamaño - Tiziano Fonseca
Marisa Bentacur - Mercedes Correa
Lucas Corrado- Peter
Agustina Mindlin - Inés
Nicolás Bouzas - Rodrigo
Carolina Casal - Rita
Lula Ocampo- Violetta
Catarina Spinetta - Laura
Romina Giardina - Miriam
Valeria Degenaro - Lía
Agustín Lecouna - Rodolfo
Romina Giardina - Miriam
Diego Alonso Gómez - Gastón Núñez
Naím Sibara - Pablo Suárez

Production 
Production of the series began on October 3, 2016. It is the first production of Endemol, Azteka Films (aka Ganas de Hacer Ficcion) with Telefe, created by Claudio Lacelli and Carolina Parmo and produced by Endemol.

The production began filming in Buenos Aires, Argentina. The series was recorded at the Estudios Mayor in Palermo Hollywood in the city of Buenos Aires, Argentina, although some scenes from the series were recorded in the city's surrounding area. At the beginning of production, the actors were Gabriel Corrado, Aylin Prandi, Catherine Fulop, Brenda Asnicar, Gastón Soffritti, Maite Zumelzú, Héctor Bidonde, Sergio Goycoechea, Sergio Surraco, Olivia Viggiano, Facundo Gambandé, among others.

References

External links
Official website

2016 telenovelas
Argentine telenovelas
Telefe telenovelas
2016 Argentine television series debuts
2017 Argentine television series endings
Spanish-language telenovelas